The Barsian mosque and minaret are historical structures in the Isfahan province. Barsian, which was originally Parsian in the past, is a village located 42 km east of Isfahan. According to the inscriptions the mosque was built in 1105 and the minaret was built in 1098 in the era of Barkiyaruq, the Seljuq king. The minaret is the fourth old minaret in Iran, which has an inscription. It is 34 m high. Its bottom part has simple bricks, but the upper parts have been decorated by decorative bricks.  

The Barsian mosque has masterly brickworks, notable mihrab and beautiful stuccoes. The brick decorations of the mosque and the cover of its dome are very similar to the Taj ol-molk dome in the Jameh Mosque of Isfahan and some believe that the Barsian mosque had the same architect as the Jame mosque of Isfahan. In the era of Tahmasp I, a courtyard and an iwan have been added to the northern side of the mosque.

References 

Architecture in Iran
Mosques in Isfahan Province
12th-century mosques